Landlust is a neighborhood of Amsterdam, Netherlands.

Amsterdam-West
Neighbourhoods of Amsterdam